Robert Condall D.D, was a priest in England.

Condall was a Fellow of Brasenose College, Oxford. He was incorporated at Cambridge in 1574. He held livings at Wytham, Little Staughton and Edgworth. Condall was Archdeacon of Huntingdon from 1576 until his death in 1612.

Notes

16th-century English Anglican priests
17th-century English Anglican priests
Archdeacons of Huntingdon
Alumni of Brasenose College, Oxford
16th-century births
1612 deaths
Year of birth unknown